Leningradsky is a rural locality (a settlement) in Nizhnekamenskoye Rural Settlement, Talovsky District, Voronezh Oblast, Russia. The population was 70 as of 2010.

Geography 
It is located 17 km southeast of Talovaya.

References 

Rural localities in Talovsky District